The 6 March 2008 Baghdad bombing was a suicide bombing attack on a shopping district in Baghdad, the capital city of Iraq, on 6 March 2008, killing 68 people and wounding 120.

The attack happened in the neighbourhood of Karrada. The attack consisted of a double bombing. A roadside bomb exploded at first and then, when the first responders and other civilians were rushing to help the wounded, a suicide bomber blew himself up.

References

2008 murders in Iraq
Mass murder in 2008
Suicide bombings in 2008
Suicide bombings in Baghdad
Terrorist incidents in Iraq in 2008
Terrorist incidents in Baghdad
2000s in Baghdad
March 2008 events in Iraq